The Hammadid dynasty was a branch of the Sanhaja Berber dynasty that ruled an area roughly corresponding to north-eastern modern Algeria between 1008 and 1152. The state reached its peak under Nasir ibn Alnas during which it was briefly the most important state in Northwest Africa. Its realm was conquered by the Almohad Caliphate.

The Hammadid dynasty's first capital was at Qalaat Beni Hammad. It was founded in 1007, and is now a UNESCO World Heritage Site. When the area was sacked by the Banu Hilal tribe, the Hammadids moved their capital to Béjaïa in 1090.

History

Establishment 
In 987 and 989, al-Mansur ibn Buluggin, the emir of the Berber Zirid dynasty, appointed his uncle Hammad ibn Buluggin as governor of Ashir and western Zirid lands. Hammad subsequently defended the territory against Zenata incursions and was granted additional lands by al-Mansur's successor Badis ibn Mansur. In 1007 and 1008, forces under Hammad left Ashir and built a new citadel-capital, Qalaat Beni Hammad (also called Al Qal'a of Beni Hammad), in  M'Sila Province in the Hodna Mountains; a thriving city sprung up around the fortress.

In 1014, Hammad declared his independence from Zirid suzerainty and switched his spiritual allegiance from the Shi'a Fatimid caliphs to the Sunni Abbasid caliphs of Baghdad. The Zirids failed to quash the rebellion and recognized Hammadid legitimacy in 1017, in a peace with al-Mu'izz that was sealed by Hammad's son and successor, Qaid ibn Hammad. In 1039 Qaid ibn Hammad (r. 1028–1054) was attacked by Hammama, the ruler of Fes, however Hammama returned to Fez, requested peace and declared his submission to the Hammadids. Al-Mu'izz subsequently also broke with the Fatimids and changed his allegiance to the Abbasids; the Fatimids under al-Mustansir, along with their fierce Bedouin Arab allies, the Banu Hilal and Banu Sulaym, subsequently launched a massive and devastating campaign in present-day Libya, Tunisia, and Algeria, culminating in al-Mu'izz's defeat in 1053 and the subsequent reduction of the Zirids to a small, insignificant territory based in Mahdia. Amidst the chaos, the Hammadids reverted their allegiance to the Fatimids and managed to negotiate an alliance with the Bedouin tribes.

Although the Hammadids and Zirids entered into an agreement in 1077 in which Zirid ruler Tamim's daughter married into the Hammadids, this did not end the rivalry between the dynasties. A common pattern was for Hammadids and Zirids to support "rival coalitions of Arab tribes to fight their proxy wars." The Hammidid–Zirid rivalry also influenced the choice of which caliph to recognize; historian Amar S. Baadj writes, "It would appear that the principle which the Hammadids followed in the course of their relations with Baghdad and Cairo was that of opposing the Zirids. Whenever the Zirids recognized one of two rival caliphs, the Hammadids would declare their submission to the other."

Apogee 
Buluggin ibn Muhammad (r. 1055–1062), a subsequent Hammadid ruler, invaded northern Morocco in 1062 and briefly took Fez for a few months before being assassinated by his paternal cousin, An-Nasir ibn Alnas, who succeeded him as emir. The Hammadid empire peaked during al-Nasir's reign. Under his reign the Hammadids established their control across large parts of the Maghreb. Al-Nasir captured Constantine and Algiers, then established Hammadid influence far to the east in Sfax, where the local ruler acknowledged Hammadid suzerainty, as well as in Susa and Tripoli. At the request of local shaykhs, he was also able to install a loyal governor in Tunis until 1067. Between 1067 and 1072 he built Béjaïa, developing it from a small fishing village into a large, fortified town and port. The Hammadids also expanded south deep into the Sahara, with Ouargla forming the southernmost city of their territory. They briefly extended their authority further to the Oued Mya.

In the 11th century, the Hammadids came under increasing pressure from the Banu Hilal, who had settled in the Plains of Constantine and increasingly threatened Qalaat Beni Hammad. While initially allied to the Bedouins, the Hammadids later became their puppets, allocating half of their harvest yields to them and buying off tribesmen in order to secure the safety of trade routes. Over time, Qalaat Beni Hammad was eventually eclipsed by Béjaïa. In 1090, with the Banu Hilal menace rising, the Hammadids moved their capital to Béjaïa, yielding their southern territories to the Hilalians. The Hammadids maintained control of a small but prosperous coastal territory between Ténès and El Kala. E.J. Brill's First Encyclopaedia of Islam (1927) states that the Qalaat Beni Hammad "was not completely abandoned by al-Mansur and he even embellished it with a number of palaces. The Hammadid kingdom had therefore at this point two capitals joined by a royal road." Renamed al-Nasiriya to honor the emir, Béjaïa developed into a sophisticated trading city; under al-Nasir and his son and successor al-Mansur ibn Nasir, large gardens, palaces, a Great Mosque, and other landmarks were constructed in the town.

An-Nasir corresponded with Pope Gregory VII and expanded commercial opportunities for Italian traders in Béjaïa. The city since flourished as a trading port and a prominent intellectual centre where even Abu Madyan and the Andalusian Shaykh Abu Ali Hassan bin Ali Muhammad taught. Leonardo Fibonacci had also studied in Béjaïa, his father was appointed as collector of customs in Béjaïaand he brought Leonardo along with him where he was taught. It was in Béjaïa where Fibonacci was introduced to the Arabic numerical system and computational method, he later introduced this numerical system to Europe. He was also introduced to a book of algebra written by al-Khwarizmi.

Decline 
In 1103–1104 the Hammadids defeated the Almoravids and took control of Tlemcen. During the reign of al-Mansur's son Abd al-Aziz ibn Mansur (r. 1105–1121), Béjaïa had about 100,000 people, and the Hammadids consolidated their power in the city. The dynasty suffered a decline after this point; efforts to develop more sea power in the Mediterranean were foiled by the Normans, who by the 12th century had conquered Sicily and had also occupied a number of settlements on the coast of Tunisia and Algeria. However, Abd al-Aziz did expel the Hilalians from Hodna and capture Jerba.

The last dynastic emir was Yahya ibn Abd al-Aziz (r. 1121–1152). Yahya repulsed Bedouin incursions and subdued uprisings by Berber clans, but during his reign the Genoese also raided Béjaïa (1136) and the Kingdom of Sicily occupied the settlement of Djidjelli and destroyed a pleasure palace that had been built there. In 1144 and 1145, Yahya  dispatched Hammadid forces to join the Almoravids in fighting the Berber Almohads, led by Almohad Caliph Abd al-Mu'min. In 1151–52, Abd al-Mu'min conquered Tlemcen and Oran (1152) and marched against the Hammadids. The Almohads took Algiers (1152) and then captured Béjaïa later the same year, crushing Hammadid forces at the gates of the city. This marked a major military triumph for Abd al-Mu'min. Yahya fled to Constantine but surrendered several months later. He died in comfortable exile in Salé, Morocco, in 1163. Abd al-Mu'min enslaved the women and children of Hammadid loyalists who had fought against him, but did not sack Béjaïa because the city had willingly surrendered.

Some 30 years after the collapse of the Hammadids, the dynasty had a brief revival in 1184, when 'Ali ibn Ghaniya—a member of the Banu Ghaniya branch of the Almoravid dynasty, which had established a corsair kingdom in the Balearic Islands—seized control of Béjaïa, recruited a mixed force of "dispossessed Hammadids, Sanhajahh Berbers, and Hilalian tribes" opposed to Almohad rule, and quickly captured Algiers, Miliana, Ashir, and al Qal'a, with the goal of establishing a new Almoravid polity in the Maghreb. Less than a year later, the Almohad had recaptured all the towns. The Banu Ghaniya did retain, through the end of the Almohad period, some influence in Tripolitania, southern Tunisia, and the Algerian plains, where Hammadid loyalists numbered among their allies.

Art and architecture

Architecture 

Qal’at Beni Hammad, the dynasty's capital, was described by Al-Bakri in the 11th century as a large and powerful military stronghold and a centre of commerce that attracted caravans from all over the Maghreb, Iraq, Syria, Egypt and the Hejaz. 14th-century Arab historian and philosopher Ibn Khaldun noted that the abundance of travellers was due to the wealth of resources offered to those interested in sciences, commerce and arts. The Qal’at attracted poets, sages and theologians. It was filled with various richly decorated palaces, caravanserai, gardens and what was to be the largest mosque built in North Africa prior to the twentieth century. The art and architecture of the Hammadids influenced that of the Arabs, Almohads, Almoravids and Normans.

Hammadid emirs constructed five palaces, most of which are now destroyed. The keep of the Palace of the Fanal (Qasr al-Manar), however, survives to this day. A minaret,  in height, is the only remaining part of the ruined Great Mosque; the structure bears some resemblance to Seville's Giralda. The Hammadid mosque is said to have been the largest mosque constructed in North Africa prior to the twentieth century and it features the typical Maghreb style square minaret. Architecture in Qalaat Beni Hammad featured adornments of "porcelain mosaics of many-colored faience, sculpted panels and plaster, enameled terra-cotta stalactites; building and pottery ornamentation consisted of geometric designs and stylized floral motifs."

Ibn Hamdis wrote two different poems describing one of the Hammadid palaces which he described having interior courts of marble that looked as if they had been carpeted with crystal and he observed that the grounds looked as if they were strewn with fine pearls. His description mentions that the palace had a pool that was bordered by marble lions with water streaming from their mouths, these lions were likely similar to that of the Alhambra.

In the Qal’at Beni Hammad fragments of stucco were discovered from the Qasr al-Salam and the Qasr al-Manar which may be the oldest fragments of muqarnas in the Western Islamic world, dating back to the 11th or 12th century. According to Lucien Golvin the fragments of the muqarnas semi-dome at the Qasr al-Salam are the oldest documented remains of a true muqarnas vault in the Islamic world. However, other scholars of Islamic architecture have questioned or rejected the dating of these fragments or their identification as true muqarnas.

Furthermore, the Qal’at buildings are considered to be documented antecedents and precursors to certain developments in Western Islamic art in the 12th century. Plaster capitals that were found at the Qal’at were composed of smooth leaves recurved in their upper part are considered to be an antecedent to the common Almoravid and Almohad forms which are seen in the Great Mosque of Tlemcen or in Tinmel. The framework of a marble basin and a grey marble fragment document the use of multifoil arches with spiral-form impost decoration. The use of this motif at the Qal’at subsequently spread during the times of the Almoravids and became universal in Almohad buildings. The square rooms surrounded by rampant barrel vaults in the Qasr al-Manar have been compared to the Almohad minarets and the Torre Pisana in Palermo which it predates. The Hammadid palaces are also noted to contain the first or one of the first documented use of shadirwan.

Art 
The excavations in the Qal’at Beni Hammad also discovered the first reference corpus of Islamic ceramics. The production of ceramics in Al-Andalus during the taifa and Almoravid periods reflect a strong and direct Hammadid influence. The technique of luster-painting on pottery was passed from al Qal-at to Béjaïa to Malaga and black painted and incised earthenware objects as well as bronze sculptures from the Zirids most likely influenced similar objects in Andalusia. Ceramic architectural decorations had never played such a large role in the Islamic world up until the Hammadids and from there it subsequently spread to Al-Andalus and Morocco where it became a hallmark for the architecture of these countries and it also spread throughout Europe.

Luster-painted and glazed ceramic decoration in a wide variety of shapes and forms were a feature in the Islamic architecture of Hammadid-era Béjaïa. Al-Nasir reputedly negotiated with Pope Gregory VII for the services of Italian masons and other skilled craftsmen for the construction of Béjaïa. Although Béjaïa is mostly in ruins, a large sea gate reportedly survives. The Bab al-Bahr (gate of the sea) was built during an-Nasirs reign along with five other gates with the purpose of protecting the town. It is now a ruin consisted of a pointed arch constructed with solid bricks. The Bab al-Bunud was also built in Béjaïa during an-Nasirs reign with hexagonal towers and its two ogival-arch gates.

In Béjaïa drawings of a facade of two palaces with ground plans by one of the Hammadids have been preserved and provide an insight into palatial architecture of the time period of the Hammadids. The first palace consisted of a huge domed hall flanked by smaller domed towers and chambers while the second palace called al-Kukab which was said to have been located where the present day Bordj Moussa is currently situated. al-Kukab consisted of a large centred hall with a gabled roof flanked by side aisles and two small towers.

The Great Mosque of Constantine was originally constructed by the Hammadids in the 12th century and was built on the ruins of a Roman temple.

Rulers
The following is a list of Hammadid rulers, starting at Hammadid independence from the Zirids in 1015 and ending with the Almohad conquest in 1152:
Hammad ibn Buluggin, 1015–1028
Qaid ibn Hammad, 1028–1054
Muhsin ibn Qaid, 1054–1055
Buluggin ibn Muhammad, 1055–1062
An-Nasir ibn Alnas, 1062–1088
Al-Mansur ibn Nasir, 1088–1105
Badis ibn Mansur, 1105
Abd al-Aziz ibn Mansur, 1105–1121
Yahya ibn Abd al-Aziz, 1121–1152

See also
List of Sunni Muslim dynasties

References

1152 disestablishments
 
Berber dynasties
Medieval Algeria